The Median multiple or Median house price to income ratio is a housing indicator used to indicate the affordability of housing in any given community. The Median house price to income ratio WAS the primary indicator H1 of the 1991 World Bank/UNCHS Housing Indicator system. It  was subsequently used as a measure of affordability by the UN Commission for Sustainable Development, the National Association of Realtors, State of the Environment 2003 Tasmania; and the Mortgage Guide UK along with many other organisations. 

The indicator has been popularised by Demographia International, and was called the 'Median multiple' from their second comparative international survey in 2006. 

The median multiple is the ratio of the median house price by the median gross (before tax) annual household income. This measure has historically hovered around a value of 3 or less, but in recent years has risen dramatically, especially in markets with public policy constraints on land and development.

The median multiple ratio has an important flaw in that it fails to account for the critical affordability component of mortgage interest rates. Mortgage interest rates are a major impacting factor on affordability as most real estate purchasers utilise mortgage finance to purchase real estate. In 1991 when the World Bank announced the median multiple as the primary affordability indicator, global mortgage rates were around 10%p.a. Since then interest rates have generally been on a long term downward trend. Whilst mortgage rates may not, stay below 10% using the median multiple in isolation to assess affordability has proven over a long period to have been a misleading affordability measure.

Table
The International Housing Affordability Survey uses the following table to determine affordability ratings:

See also 
 Affordable housing
 Inclusionary zoning
 Land-use planning
 Land titling
 Real estate

References 

Affordable housing